Valu-Rite is a  network of over 4,000 independently owned and operated pharmacies established in 1979. It has a business affiliation with McKesson Pharmaceuticals, which sponsors the network and owns the name "Valu-Rite". It operates like a retailers' cooperative, though it is not owned by its members.

Radio commercials for Valu-Rite in the 1980s used spokesmen Dick Clark and Tom Bosley.

External links
 [ Valu-Rite]
 McKesson's Valu-Rite page

Pharmacies of the United States
Retailers' cooperatives in the United States
American companies established in 1979
Retail companies established in 1979